Dyrham Park is a baroque English country house in an ancient deer park near the village of Dyrham in South Gloucestershire, England. The house, with the attached orangery and stable block is a Grade I listed building, while the park is Grade II* listed on the National Register of Historic Parks and Gardens.

The current house was built for William Blathwayt in stages during the 17th and early 18th centuries on the site of a previous manor house, with the final facade being designed by William Talman. It contains art works and furniture from around the world, particularly Holland, and includes a collection of Dutch Masters. The house is linked to the 13th-century church of St Peter, also Grade I listed, where many of the Blathwayt family are buried. The grounds, which were originally laid out by George London and later developed by Charles Harcourt Masters, include water features and statuary.

The house and estate are now owned by the National Trust and underwent extensive renovation in 2014 and 2015. They are open to the public on some days and host events and attractions, including open-air concerts. They have also been used as a location for film and television productions.

In 2020, Dyrham Park was one of 93 historic houses identified by the National Trust as having links with Britain’s four hundred years of colonial rule and slave-owning past. Dyrham Park has links to Virginia, Barbados, and Jamaica.

History

The Manor of Dyrham has been recorded since the Domesday Book of 1086, when there were 34 households. The first lord of the manor to be resident may have been William Denys, who was an Esquire of the Body to Henry VIII and later High Sheriff of Gloucestershire. He was granted the licence to empark  of Dyrham in 1511, although not all of this area was enclosed. This meant that he could enclose the land with a wall or hedgebank and maintain a captive herd of deer within the park, over which he had exclusive hunting rights; the name "Dyrham" derives from the Anglo-Saxon word dirham, an enclosure for deer. The estate was sold to the Wynter family in 1571 and Sir George Wynter was allowed to empark further land in 1620.

In 1689 the estate was acquired through marriage by William Blathwayt, who was Secretary at War to William III. He retained the existing Tudor building and expanded it in stages. The west front of 1692 was commissioned from the Huguenot architect, Samuel Hauduroy, and includes an Italianate double staircase leading from the terrace to the grounds. In 1698 a stable block with space for 26 horses, and servants' quarters above, around a courtyard was added. The east front of 1704 was designed by William Talman, architect of Chatsworth. The construction of the east wing included demolition of the remains of the original Tudor house and the addition of a statue of an eagle on the roof.

Owing to Blathwayt's royal connections, and his influential uncle, Thomas Povey, a member of the Royal African Company who held under Oliver Cromwell a high post in the Office of Plantations, Dyrham became a showcase of Dutch decorative arts. The collection includes delftware, paintings and furniture. Eighteenth-century additions include furniture by Gillow and Linnell. The interiors have remained little altered since decorated by Blathwayt. The gardens were designed by George London in the late 17th and early 18th centuries.

The Blathwayt family owned the house until 1956, when the government acquired it, but during the Second World War it was used for child evacuees while rented by Anne, Baroness Islington, the widow of The 1st Baron Islington (1866-1936), a former Governor of New Zealand; Lady Islington redecorated many of the rooms. The National Trust acquired it in 1961. In 2015 major renovation work, costing £3.8 million, included replacing the roof. Part of the cost was met from a Heritage Lottery Fund grant of £85,000. While the repairs were in progress, visitors could view the house from a rooftop walkway.

Architecture

House

The limestone building has slate and lead roofs above the attics. The two-storey west front, which was built in the 1690s, has three bays of each side of the central doorway, which has Doric columns, with smaller pavilions at the ends of the wings. One of the wings creates a covered passageway to the church of St Peter. The east front, which was added around 1704, has shallow projecting wings and a central door under a balustrade with an Italianate double staircase leading down to the lawns. A central pedestal is inscribed "virtute et veritate". Above it is an eagle statue, carved by John Harvey of Bath, representing the family crest of the Blathwayt family.

The interior is sumptuously decorated with wood panelling and tiles of Delftware. The collection of artworks and artifacts includes furniture, china and pictures with a strong Dutch influence. The china includes a pair of tulip vases made in the 1680s. The state bed, with crimson and yellow velvet hangings, was made in Anglo-Dutch style around 1704. The entrance hall is hung with bird paintings by Melchior d'Hondecoeter and throughout the house are landscape and still lifes by Abraham Storck, Samuel Dirksz van Hoogstraten, David Teniers the Younger, Melchior d'Hondecoeter, and other Dutch Masters. Hoogstratens "View of a Corridor" has been hung in a doorway as the artist originally intended. Blathwayt's travels are also represented by paintings by Spanish artists such as Bartolomé Esteban Murillo and a staircase made of walnut from his estates as auditor general of the Colony of Virginia. Many of these were brought to Dyrham by George William Blathwayt after he inherited the house in 1844. There are also artifacts from Blathwayt's journeys to other parts of the world, particularly Jamaica.

Orangery and stable block

On the south eastern side of the house is an orangery, which was built as a greenhouse in 1701 and has a glazed roof which was added around 1800 by Humphrey Repton. The orangery hides the view of the servants' quarters from the main house. The servants' quarters was revised and modernised in the 1840s. It contains the kitchen, dairy, bakehouse and several larders for raw and cooked meat. There is also a servants' hall where the staff would take their meals and a tenants' hall which was used by the tenant farmers to eat on the days when they came to pay their rent. In addition to the designs for the house, William Talman created the large 15-bay stable block. It is now used as a tea-room for visitors.

Church

The Anglican parish church of St Peter was originally built in the mid 13th century and had a three-stage tower added in the 15th, however it was extensively restored when the main house was built in the late 17th century. The church consists of a north and south aisle, chancel and south west porch with the tower to the west. In the south aisle are encaustic tiles dating from the 13th century. The font is Norman while the pulpit is Jacobean. There is also a 16th-century Flemish altar triptych.

The church is not owned by the National Trust but is closely associated with the rest of the estate and has the tombs and memorials for many owners of the house. The parish is part of the benefice of Wick with Doynton and Dyrham, within the Diocese of Bristol.

Grounds

Many of the walls and gatepiers were added in the late 18th century. Artificial lakes and cascades of water are also a feature.

The gardens were designed by George London in the late 17th and early 18th centuries. They included a formal Dutch water garden, but most of the features were replaced in the late 18th century with designs by Charles Harcourt Masters. The park is  listed Grade II* on the National Register of Historic Parks and Gardens.

Public access

The house and gardens are open to the public on certain days, and the  grounds are open all year long. A bus takes visitors from the car park down to the house, gardens, tea room and shop. The bus road can be walked down for access to the house or there is an easy walk to the house down grassy slopes. There is no car parking at the house itself. Dogs are not permitted in the park, but there is an exercise area for dogs near the car park. Events within the park include music concerts, open-air theatre productions, guided tours of the house, park and garden, and other attractions.

Film and television

Dyrham Park was one of the houses used as a filming location for the 1993 Merchant Ivory film The Remains of the Day (others included Badminton House and Powderham Castle). The house was used for outdoor and garden scenes in the 1999 BBC mini-series Wives and Daughters. In 2003, it was the filming location for the BBC One series Servants. An aerial view of Dyrham Park was featured in the opening title sequence of the 2008 film Australia.

In September 2010, the BBC filmed scenes for the Doctor Who sixth series episode "Night Terrors" at Dyrham Park.

Dyrham Park was also used for scenes in The Crimson Field by the BBC in 2014, and Sanditon on ITV in 2019.

The BBC series, Poldark, filmed scenes at Dyrham Park, as the home of George Warleggan, between 2015 and 2018.

References

External links

 Dyrham Park at the National Trust

Country houses in Gloucestershire
Buildings and structures in South Gloucestershire District
National Trust properties in Gloucestershire
Gardens in Gloucestershire
Historic house museums in Gloucestershire
Decorative arts museums in England
Grade I listed houses in Gloucestershire
Grade II* listed parks and gardens in Gloucestershire